Perris Records is an American record label that focuses on heavy metal and all its less-known categories, such as glam rock, hair metal, sleaze rock and hard rock in general.

History 
Perris Records was founded by rock musician Tom Mathers in Houston (Texas, USA) in the early 1990s. With his hard rock band Cherry St. signed with JRS/BMG to release "Squeeze It Dry". JRS records had The Stray Cats and Asia  on their roster. After the band broke up he decided in 1993 to found his own music label.

A number of well-known rock bands, who survived the crisis period of the early 1990s, caused by the shift in musical taste from hard rock to grunge, gradually started to work with Perris Records. At the start of the new millennium, this publishing house drew in a new generation of hard rock bands and musicians. Perris Records has thus become a specific record label of this minority musical style and of its fans around the world, from the late 90s to the present day. In 2005 Perris Records opened new office in Europe, based in Copenhagen, Denmark.

From 2006 to 2009, Perris Records published  every two months in paper  form the magazine Rocknation, given out in 100,000 copies free of charge in more than 750 music stores in the United States. Currently it is only published in the online version.

Rocknation TV was a 30-minute television show focusing on music videos and interviews with artists, which until 2009 was broadcast on Time Warner Cable television in 250 of America's largest cities. A total of 55 episodes were shot.

Bands and artists who collaborate with Perris records 

 Bang Tango
 Beverly Killz
 Big Cock
 Black 'N Blue
 Bruce Kulick 
 BulletBoys
 Captain Mendess
 Cinderella
 Cherry St.
 Danger Danger
 Dangerous Toys
 Dreams Now Reality
 Enuff Z'Nuff
 Europe
 Every Mother's Nightmare
 George Lynch
 Gilby Clarke
 Heaven's Edge
 Helix
 Jetboy
 Keel
 Kristy Majors
 L.A. Guns
 Leatherwolf
 Loud N Nasty
 Love/Hate
 Michael Angelo Batio
 Michael Sweet
 Nasty Idols
 Odin
 Pretty Boy Floyd
 Razamanaz
 Roxx
 Roxx Gang
 Steevi Jaimz
 Stephen Pearcy
 Stryper
 Vain
 Vicious Rumors
 Warrant
 Zan Clan

References

External links 
 Perris Records Official Website
 Rocknation magazine online
Perris Records Allmusic

Heavy metal record labels
American record labels
Record labels established in 1993
Organizations based in Houston